A Song for You is a 1975 album by The Temptations. It features two R&B #1 hits: "Happy People" (originally intended for recording by its authors, The Commodores), and "Shakey Ground", one of the group's final R&B #1 songs.

Music and lyrics 
The album features then-lead singer Dennis Edwards on the title track written by Leon Russell. Also featured are Richard Street and Melvin Franklin on the track "Firefly".

A Song for You features a familiar device of the time used to exhibit the versatility of 1970s soul groups: one side features up-tempo cuts and the other side focuses on ballads. Several songs on side one such as "Glass House" and "Shakey Ground" featured P-Funk-backed dance grooves and even a writing credit for former Funkadelic guitarist Eddie Hazel, while side two had tracks such as "I'm a Bachelor" and "Memories", which showcased a more subdued style of soul.

Release and reception 

This album, while it was initially panned by the Rolling Stone Record Guide, proved its worth, going gold (selling over 500,000 copies) and winning the 1976 American Music Award for Best R&B/Soul Album.  This was also the final album by Eddie Kendricks's replacement Damon Harris, who was let go after this album. He would rejoin his Young Tempts (aka "The Young Vandals") bandmates as Impact.

Track listing

Personnel
Dennis Edwards - vocals
Damon Harris - vocals
Richard Street - vocals
Melvin Franklin - vocals
Otis Williams - vocals
Berry Gordy - producer
Jeffrey Bowen - producer
Donald Charles Baldwin - co-songwriter: ("Happy People", "Memories"), piano, clavinet, Moog, soprano saxophone solo on "Shakey Ground"
The Commodores - tape loop on "Happy People"
Lionel Richie - co-songwriter:  ("Happy People")
Eddie Hazel - co-songwriter: ("Shakey Ground"), guitar
Melvin "Wah-Wah" Ragin - guitar
Ollie Brown, James Gadson, Zachary Frazier - drums
William "Billy Bass" Nelson - bass guitar

Charts

See also
List of number-one R&B albums of 1975 (U.S.)

References

1975 albums
The Temptations albums
Gordy Records albums
Albums produced by Berry Gordy
Albums produced by Jeffrey Bowen